The Lola T98/00 is an open-wheel racing car chassis, designed and built by Lola Cars that competed in the CART open-wheel racing series, for competition in the 1998 IndyCar season. It was unfortunately another very unsuccessful season for them, with Lola scoring no wins or pole positions that season. It was mainly powered by the  Ford/Cosworth XB turbo engine.

References 

Open wheel racing cars
American Championship racing cars
Lola racing cars